Fabrice Aragno (born 31 March 1970) is a Swiss director, producer, and cinematographer.

Career
He attended the École cantonale d'art de Lausanne, graduating in 1998.

Aragno has made several short films, including Dimanche (his graduation film, selected for the 1999 Cannes Film Festival), Le Jeu (2003), and Autoure de Claire (2010).

Since 2002, he has worked with Jean-Luc Godard, directing Notre musique (2004) and on picture and sound for Film Socialisme (2010), Les Trois Désastres (2013) and Goodbye to Language (2014).

To create certain effects in the 3D film, Aragno built his own camera rig in order to allow the 3D image to appear as a double exposure in each of the spectators eyes. This effect has been called innovative and a new addition to cinematic techniques. Aragno said that he "made a couple of tests with friends at their home of a boy and a girl…I asked the boy to go to the kitchen on my right, and the right camera followed him and the left stayed, so the 3-D broke. The girl is in your left eyes and the boy on the right. When he was in the kitchen, your brain didn’t know how to watch. It hurts to watch a little, but it was interesting, and when the boy comes back to the girl, the two cameras were again in classic 3-D."

In 2012, Radio Télévision Suisse (RTS) employed him as director on a documentary film about Godard, one of a 10-part series on Swiss directors. The film, Quod Erat Demonstrandum, is a 26-minute montage of clips from Godard's films.

Working with the Swiss Film Archive, he edited and co-produced the films Amore carne and Sangue, directed by Pippo Delbono, and directed Freddy Buache, le cinéma. He also produced L'invisible (2013) for the Lemancolia exhibition held at the Musée Jenisch de Vevey, and Pris dans le tourbillon (2014) for general release.

Filmography

Director of photography 
 2010 : Film Socialisme by Jean-Luc Godard
 2013 : Les Trois Désastres by Jean-Luc Godard
 2014 : Adieu au langage by Jean-Luc Godard
 2018 : The image book by Jean-Luc Godard

Director 
 1997 : Luchando frijoles - Cuba de un día a otro
 1998 : Dimanche
 2002 : Le Jeu
 2010 : Autour de Claire
 2012 : Freddy Buache - Le Cinéma
 2012 : Quod Erat Demonstrandum
 2013 : L'invisible
 2014 : Pris dans le tourbillon

Editor and producer
 2011 : Amore Carne by Pippo Delbono
 2013 : Sangue by Pippo Delbono

Sources

References

External links 

 
 Fabrice Aragno on swissfilms.ch 

Living people
1970 births